The canton of Villeneuve-l'Archevêque is a former canton of France, located in the Yonne département. It had 6,313 inhabitants (2012). It was disestablished by the French reorganisation of cantons which came into effect in March 2015. It had 17 communes.

The canton comprised the following communes:

 Bagneaux
 Chigy
 Les Clérimois
 Courgenay
 Flacy
 Foissy-sur-Vanne
 Lailly
 Molinons
 Pont-sur-Vanne
 La Postolle
 Saint-Maurice-aux-Riches-Hommes
 Les Sièges
 Theil-sur-Vanne
 Vareilles
 Villeneuve-l'Archevêque
 Villiers-Louis
 Voisines

See also 
 Cantons of the Yonne department

References

Villeneuve-l'Archeveque
2015 disestablishments in France
States and territories disestablished in 2015